Spanish Town Hospital is a hospital in Spanish Town, Jamaica. It is located near the city center.

2007 incident
On 24 June 2007, the Danish singer Natasja Saad was involved in a car crash and later died at the hospital.

References

External links
https://web.archive.org/web/20120509041758/http://www.hospitalsworldwide.com/listings/16847.php

Hospitals in Jamaica
Spanish Town